The 1999 Air Botswana incident occurred when Chris Phatswe, a Botswana airline pilot, killed himself by crashing a plane into the airport apron and a group of aircraft at Sir Seretse Khama International Airport in Gaborone, Botswana. He was the only casualty. His actions effectively crippled operations for Air Botswana.

Incident
On 11 October 1999, Phatswe commandeered an Aérospatiale ATR 42-320, registration A2-ABB, from the Air Botswana section of the terminal at Sir Seretse Khama International Airport and took off.  For two hours he circled the airport, radioing the control tower and announcing his intention to kill himself. The airport was evacuated as a precaution; passengers later reported a good deal of panic in the terminal. Officials in the tower attempted to convince him to land; efforts were led by General Tebogo Masire, then deputy commander of the Botswana Defence Force.
Phatswe threatened to crash it into an Air Botswana building, saying he had a grudge against the airline's management. He demanded to speak to Ian Khama, Botswana's then vice-president, but when officials in the control tower told Phatswe that there were people in the Air Botswana building, he changed his mind. Shortly after being put through to Khama, the ATR-42 began to run out of fuel, so Phatswe carried out a successful landing, but instead of surrendering to airport security, he proceeded to taxi towards the apron at high speed, slamming the stolen plane into two other ATR-42s on the ramp. All three planes were destroyed in a fiery crash, and Phatswe was killed. He was the only casualty.

The three planes were the only operational craft then in the Air Botswana fleet; a fourth plane, a BAe-146, was grounded with technical trouble at the time. Consequently, Phatswe's actions effectively crippled operations for the flag carrier.

Motives
Phatswe had repeatedly threatened airport authorities, telling them that he would kill himself, but never gave a reason. At the time of the incident he was on medical leave from the airline, having failed a physical two months previously and been declared unfit to fly; consequently, he was not authorized to take the plane. Airport security was reported to be lax, and it was said to be quite easy for somebody to steal an aircraft.

See also 

1977 Connellan air disaster - suicide attack by a disgruntled former airline employee using a stolen aircraft
2018 Horizon Air Q400 incident - Aircraft theft and suicide crash by a ground employee of Horizon Air
Accidents and incidents involving the ATR 42 family
 
 List of accidents and incidents involving commercial aircraft

References

External links


Aviation accidents and incidents in 1999
Suicides in Botswana
Aviation accidents and incidents in Botswana
Accidents and incidents involving the ATR 42
Airliner accidents and incidents involving deliberate crashes
Air Botswana Incident, 1999
October 1999 events in Africa
Airliner accidents and incidents involving ground collisions